The 1978 European Judo Championships were the 28th edition of the European Judo Championships, and were held in Helsinki, Finland on 6 May 1978.  The victors were East Germany. The 1978 European Team Championships took place in Paris on 21 and 22 October 1978. The team event also being organized separately from this year edition onwards. The European Women's Championships were held in Cologne, West Germany, in November of the same year.

Medal overview

Medal table

References 

 Results of the 1978 European Judo Championships (JudoInside.com)

E
1978 in Finland
European Judo Championships
1970s in Helsinki
International sports competitions in Helsinki
Judo competitions in Finland
International sports competitions hosted by Finland
May 1978 sports events in Europe